This is a list of adverse effects of the anti-cancer drug nilotinib, sorted by frequency of occurrence.

Very common
Very common (>10% incidence) adverse effects include:

 Headache
 Nausea
 Hypophosphataemia
 Hyperbilirubinaemia
 Alanine aminotransferase (ALT) increased
 Aspartate aminotransferase increased
 Lipase increased
 Rash
 Itchiness
 Hair loss
 Dry skin
 Muscle aches
 Fatigue

Common
Common (1–10% incidence) adverse effects include:

 Constipation
 Diarrhoea
 Vomiting
 Upper abdominal pain
 Indigestion
 Joint pain
 Muscle spasms
 Pain in extremities
 Asthenia
 Peripheral oedema
 Folliculitis
 Upper respiratory tract infection (including pharyngitis, nasopharyngitis, rhinitis)
 Skin papilloma
 Eosinophilia
 Lymphopenia
 Insomnia
 Anxiety
 Depression
 Diabetes mellitus
 Hypercholesterolaemia
 Hyperlipidaemia
 Hypertriglyceridaemia
 Hyperglycaemia
 Loss of appetite
 Dizziness
 Hypoaesthesia
 Peripheral neuropathy
 Eye pruritus
 Conjunctivitis
 Dry eye (including xerophthalmia)
 Vertigo
 Flushing
 Hypertension
 Angina pectoris
 Arrhythmia (including atrioventricular block, tachycardia, atrial fibrillation, ventricular extrasystoles, bradycardia)
 QT interval prolonged
 Palpitations
 Cough
 Dyspnoea
 Abdominal distension
 Abdominal discomfort
 Taste changes
 Flatulence
 Abnormal liver function
 Bone pain
 Back pain
 Erythema
 Hyperhidrosis
 Contusion
 Acne
 Dermatitis (including allergic, exfoliative and acneiform)
 Night sweats
 Fever without an infectious cause
 Chest pain (including non-cardiac chest pain)
 Chest discomfort
 Decreased haemoglobin
 Increased blood amylase
 Increased blood alkaline phosphatase 
 Gamma-glutamyltransferase increased
 Weight increased
 Increased blood insulin
 Increased lipoprotein (including very low density and high density)

Uncommon
Uncommon (0.1–1% incidence) adverse effects include:

 Arteriosclerosis
 Bone marrow suppression
 Both increases and decreases of potassium levels
 Body temperature change sensation (both hot and cold)
 Chills
 Cognitive deficits
 Conjunctival bleeding and redness
 Cyanosis
 Dental sensitivity to pain
 Bleeding into the lungs
 Increased blood cholesterol and lipid levels
 Dystonia
 Erectile dysfunction
 Eyelid swelling
 Flank pain
 Gastritis
 Gout
 Decreased calcium levels
 Jaundice
 Malaise
 Migraine
 Muscle pain and weakness
 Pancreatitis
 Paraesthesia
 Peripheral arterial occlusive disease
 Photopsia
 Pleural effusion
 Skin eruptions
 Skin pain
 Decreased globulins

References

Nilotinib